Teesri Ankh is a 1988 Hindi-language action drama film directed by Subodh Mukherji and produced by Subir Mukherjee. This film was released on 23 April 1982 in the banner of Sasadhar Mukherjee Productions. Music direction was made by Laxmikant–Pyarelal.

Plot
One day an honest common man Kailash Nath brings a newborn orphan baby in their house. Kailash and his wife Malati brings him up and give him a name, Ashok. Kailash confronts with a dreaded dacoit, Jabbar Singh subsequently Jabbar threats to him but Kailash's friend, Inspector Om arrests Jabbar and he was sentenced to be hanged. Jabbar's son Sheru kills Kailash for taking revenge. At death bed Kailash confesses to Malati that Ashok is his first wife's son. Although Malati promises to take care of Ashok as his own but she can not. She always blames Ashok thinking as step son. One of her other two sons Amar is missing and another Anand fallen into bad company and imprisoned for criminal offenses, her family become cursed after the death of Kailash. Without having any way Malati goes to Ashok for remedy. They unite to fight against enemy.

Cast
 Dharmendra as Ashok
 Shatrughan Sinha as Sagar
 Rakesh Roshan as Anand
 Zeenat Aman as Barkha
 Neetu Singh as Nisha
 Sarika as Rekha
 Nirupa Roy as Malti
 Pradeep Kumar as I.G. Malhotra
 Mehmood as Hanuman Singh
 I. S. Johar as Mirchandani
 Jeevan as Paul
 Ranjeet as Robinson
 Kader Khan as
 Amjad Khan as Jabbar Singh
 Om Shivpuri as Inspector Om
 Satyen Kappu as Kailashnath
 Helen
 Viju Khote
 Rakesh Bedi
 Urmila Bhatt

Soundtrack

References

External links

1982 films
1980s Hindi-language films
Films scored by Laxmikant–Pyarelal
Indian action drama films
1980s action drama films